Eddie Larsson (born February 15, 1991) is a Swedish professional ice hockey defenceman. He is currently playing  with Linköping HC of the Swedish Hockey League (SHL).

Larsson has previously played for Modo Hockey, the Växjö Lakers and Luleå HF, while also appearing for BIK Karlskoga of the HockeyAllsvenskan.

References

External links

1991 births
Living people
Bofors IK players
BIK Karlskoga players
Linköping HC players
Luleå HF players
Modo Hockey players
IF Sundsvall Hockey players
Swedish ice hockey defencemen
Växjö Lakers players